Botryosphaeria stevensii is a fungal plant pathogen that causes cankers on several tree species including apple and juniper as well as black dead arm on grape. It causes branch dieback, possibly affecting a large portion of the tree canopy, and if severe it can kill entire plants. Prevention efforts may include careful selection of plants, including resistant cultivars, planting in well-draining loose soils, exposure to light and plant spacing to reduce moisture retention.

References

External links
 Index Fungorum
 USDA ARS Fungal Database

Fungal plant pathogens and diseases
Apple tree diseases
Grapevine trunk diseases
stevensii
Fungi described in 1964